The 1932-33 French Rugby Championship was won by Lyon OU that defeated Narbonne in the final.

In this edition, there were the "come back" of the 14 club of the UFRA (Union française de rugby amateur) after two year of separated championship.

Really, the team readmitted were 12, because the Stade Nantais restart from the second division and the US Narbonne disappeared.  In any case were 54 the teams admitted at the championship, divided in 6 pools of nine

Six team participating at previous edition were not qualified: Cognac, Lorrain, Romans-Péage, La Teste, SC Toulouse and Villeneuve-sur-Lot

Eight were the "new" clubs respect the previous edition: Angoulême, Bergerac, Dax, Libourne, Oyonnax, Pamiers, Primevères, and Valence Sportif.

First round

(in bold the winner, qualified to semifinals)

 Pool A Albi, Auch, Boucau, Pamiers, Pau, Soustons, Stadoceste, Toulouse OEC, Tyrosse
 Pool B Agen, Bayonne, SA Bordeaux, Stade Bordelais, Dax, Gujan-Mestras, Hendaye, Lourdes, Stade Nay
 Pool C Angoulême, AS Bayonne, Bègles, US Bergerac, Biarritz, Libourne, Oloron, Périgueux, Peyrehorade.
 Pool D Bort, Brive, Carcassonne, Montauban, Narbonne, Arlequins Perpignan, Quillan, Thuir, Toulose
 Pool E Béziers, Grenoble, FC Lyon, Oyonnax, US Perpignan, Pézenas, Touloun, Valence, Vienne
 Pool F CASG Paris, Limoges, Lyon OU, Montferrand, Primevères, Racing Paris, Roanne, Saint-Claude, Stade Français

Semifinals

Pool 1

Ranking: 1. Narbonne 6pt, 2. Bayonne 4pt, 3. Touloun 2 pt.

Pool 2 

Ranking: 1. Lyon OU 4pt (+4) ., 2. Pau pt (+3), 3. UA Libourne (-7)

Final

Other competitions

 The Challenge Yves du Manoir was won by le SU Agen, premier de poule.
 The "Honneur" championship was won by Stade Nantais, which beat Lézignan, 11–5
 "Promotion": won the Cercle Sportif Lons that beat US Coursan, 10–3
 Second division: Amicale Sportive Eymet beat US Dole, 10–3
 Third division: US Métropolitains beat SC Perpignan, 8–3
 Fourth division : SC Graulhet beat FC Tournon, 17–3
 2nd XV tournament: Touloun beat Montferrand, 10–0
 Junior championship: Montferrand beat Boucau, 6–3

Sources 
 Compte rendu de la finale de 1933, sur lnr.fr
 L’Humanité, 1932-1933
 Finalesrugby.com

1933
France|France
Championship